DELGA may refer to:
 LGBT+ Liberal Democrats, a group within the Liberal Democrats British political party
 DELGA-1, a Georgian light assault vehicle for special operations forces designed in 2002

Delga may refer to:
 Carole Delga, President of the French Occitania administrative region
 Dalga, a town of about 120,000 people in Minya Governorate in Egypt

Disambiguation pages with surname-holder lists